Hatschbachiella is a genus of South American flowering plants in the family Asteraceae.

 Species
 Hatschbachiella polyclada (Dusén ex Malme) R.M.King & H.Rob. - Paraná
 Hatschbachiella tweedieana (Hook. ex Hook. & Arn.) R.M.King & H.Rob. - Brazil, Bolivia, Paraguay, Uruguay

References

Eupatorieae
Asteraceae genera
Flora of South America